Marino Specia (born 16 September 1943) is an Italian rower. He competed in the men's coxless pair event at the 1968 Summer Olympics.

References

1943 births
Living people
Italian male rowers
Olympic rowers of Italy
Rowers at the 1968 Summer Olympics
Sportspeople from Trieste